The 2018 Kansas Lottery 300 was the 30th stock car race of the 2018 NASCAR Xfinity Series season, the first race in the Round of 12, and the 18th iteration of the event. The race was held on Saturday, October 20, 2018, in Kansas City, Kansas at Kansas Speedway, a 1.500 miles (2.414 km) permanent paved oval-shaped racetrack. The race took the scheduled 200 laps to complete. At race's end, John Hunter Nemechek of Chip Ganassi Racing would take advantage of a late-race restart and pass eventual second-place driver Richard Childress Racing driver Daniel Hemric to win his first career NASCAR Xfinity Series win and his first and only win of the season. To fill out the podium, Elliott Sadler of JR Motorsports would finish third.

Background 

Kansas Speedway is a 1.5-mile (2.4 km) tri-oval race track in Kansas City, Kansas. It was built in 2001 and hosts two annual NASCAR race weekends. The NTT IndyCar Series also raced there until 2011. The speedway is owned and operated by the International Speedway Corporation.

Entry list

Practice

First practice 
The first practice session was held on Friday, October 19, at 2:05 PM CST, and would last for 50 minutes.

Second and final practice 
The second and final practice session, sometimes referred to as Happy Hour, was held on Friday, October 19, at 4:00 PM CST, and would last for 50 minutes.

Qualifying 
Qualifying was held on Saturday, October 20, at 10:40 AM CST. Since Kansas Speedway is under 2 miles (3.2 km), the qualifying system was a multi-car system that included three rounds. The first round was 15 minutes, where every driver would be able to set a lap within the 15 minutes. Then, the second round would consist of the fastest 24 cars in Round 1, and drivers would have 10 minutes to set a lap. Round 3 consisted of the fastest 12 drivers from Round 2, and the drivers would have 5 minutes to set a time. Whoever was fastest in Round 3 would win the pole.

Three drivers would fail to qualify: Bayley Currey, Morgan Shepherd, and Max Tullman.

Full qualifying results

Race results 
Stage 1 Laps: 45

Stage 2 Laps: 45

Stage 3 Laps: 110

References 

2018 NASCAR Xfinity Series
NASCAR races at Kansas Speedway
October 2018 sports events in the United States
2018 in sports in Kansas